Notoporus is a genus of trematodes in the family Opecoelidae.

Species
Notoporus astrocongeris Shen & Qiu, 1995
Notoporus fotedari (Ahmad & Dhar, 1989) Madhavi, 2011
Notoporus gibsoni Ahmad, 1987
Notoporus leiognathi Yamaguti, 1938
Notoporus pristipomatis (Srivastava, 1942) Ahmad, 1985
Notoporus stunkardi Ahmad, 1985

Species later synonymised with species of Notoporus
Notoporus fotedari (Ahmad & Dhar, 1989) Madhavi, 2011
Neonotoporus fotedari Ahmad & Dhar, 1989
Notoporus pristipomatis (Srivastava, 1942) Ahmad, 1985
Horatrema pristipomatis Srivatava, 1942

References

Opecoelidae
Plagiorchiida genera